Violet Lloyd (25 November 1879 - ? c.1924) was an English actress, singer and Edwardian music hall performer. Her father was Samuel Lloyd and a sister Florence Lloyd (born 1876) was also an actress. She was a second cousin of Lydia Thompson and her daughter Zeffie Tilbury. Lloyd made her stage debut at ten years old in February 1889 appearing with The Kendals at the Theatre Royal, Nottingham. She made many appearances at the Gaiety Theatre especially in an Asian themed play called The Geisha. She was understudy to Ellaline Terriss at the Gaiety and after 1905 toured with George Edwardes company. Many later roles in the theatre were well-known children's characters i.e. Humpty-Dumpty, Red Riding Hood, Jack and the Beanstalk, and Aladdin.

References

External links
Violet Lloyd at IBDb.com
portrait(Ogden's Guinea Gold Cigarettes)(archived)
portrait(Ogden's  ; archived)
Violet Lloyd reading (archived)
portrait(eBay)(Wayback Machine)
 Lloyd, her sister Florence and some of their contemporaries

1879 births
1924 deaths
English stage actresses
19th-century English actresses
20th-century English actresses
Actresses from London
Music hall performers